Pralhad Anant Dhond (1908–2001) was an Indian painter and art educator.

Early life background
Dhond was born in 1908 in Ratnagiri. After finishing his schooling in Malvan, he moved to Mumbai where he studied at Sir J. J. School of Art in years 1930–1934. He then pursued The Art Teachers Examination in 1935, soon followed by a master's degree in Art in 1937.

Career
He was the Head of Teacher's Training Department for 20 years. From year 1958 he was Dean of Sir J. J. School of Art, Mumbai. He retired as the Director of Art Maharashtra State in 1969 His paintings were exhibited in San Francisco, Berlin, Munich, South Africa, Kabul, Ankara, China and Russia. In India through the All India Fine Arts and Crafts Society, Delhi, Bhau Daji Lad Museum, Lalit Kala Akademi, Vidhan Bhavan, Bombay, Nagpur Central Museum, Nagpur, Baroda Museum, Baroda. A strong believer in artistic tradition, Dhond, always considered the landscape of Ratnagiri in Maharashtra, where he grew up, as the most formative influence on his artistic sensibility. Dhond chose the medium of watercolour for his transparent yet fascinating depiction of various moods of nature and was known as one of the leading water-colourists of India. He constantly worked and travelled to enrich his work. At the age of 92, he visited the Kerala backwaters and had almost completed his series on God's own country at the time of his death. His work consists of 7,000 landscapes, spanning over seven decades. He says about his work "I always say it takes me five minutes and 70 years to complete a painting. It is only after devoting a lifetime to water colours that I have mastered the medium".

He recalls his journey as an artist in his autobiography 'Raapan'.

References

Further reading

External links
 Profile at Art India Bazaar.
 Profile at Saffronart.

1908 births
2001 deaths
Indian art curators
Indian male painters
Sir Jamsetjee Jeejebhoy School of Art alumni
Academic staff of Sir J. J. School of Art
Indian watercolourists
20th-century Indian painters
People from Ratnagiri district
Painters from Maharashtra
20th-century Indian male artists